Yukthivadi  (The Rationalist) was the first  rationalist/atheist journal published in Malayalam.  The contribution made by Yukthivadi to the renaissance of Kerala, India is significant. The launch of Yukthivadi marks the beginning of organised rationalism in Kerala, which is a key constituent of the Reformation Movement in the state.

History and profile
Yukthivadi started its publication in August 1929 from Ernakulam under the editorial board of M. Ramavarma Thampan, C. Krishnan, C. V. Kunhiraman, Sahodaran Ayyappan and M.C. Joseph. In a statement published in the first issue of Yukthivadi, Sahodaran K. Ayyappan wrote:
Rationalism is not a religion. It is an attitude to accept knowledge based upon reason.   Yukthivadi will attempt to generate such an attitude amongst the people.  To do this, we will have to criticize irrational faiths and propagate rational knowledge.  Since Yukthivadi does not believe in any ultimate knowledge, it will not hesitate to correct itself based upon the latest information and knowledge.  Every rationalist is bound to do so.  The only maxim that Yukthivadi accepts as unchangeable is that the knowledge should be based upon reason.

In spite of the fact that all of the editorial board members were well known social activists, the conservative Kerala welcomed its publication with expected derision. Even such a well known personality as Moorkoth Kumaran did not hesitate to pen a poem denigrating the publishers. Not surprisingly, a meeting of a religious sect passed a resolution cursing the publishers of Yukthivadi!

In August 1931 M.C.Joseph became its sole editor-publisher and shifted the publication to Irinjalakkuda.  For the next forty five  years until June 1974 M.C.Joseph brought out the magazine without any interruption.  In July 1974, because of his failing health (he was 87 then),  he handed over the magazine to Unni Kakkanad, who published it for yet another decade before it ceased publication1.

The vibrant rationalist movement that is seen in Kerala today is undoubtedly the direct consequence of the ideas spread by Yukthivadi for more than half a century.

See also
 Sahodaran

Notes
 An attempt was made in the 1990s by the late C.G.Jayashankar, a Trissur based rationalist activist, to revive the magazine. But it was wound up after bringing out a few issues.

External links 
 Sahodaran K. Ayyappan
 C.V.Kunhiraman

Defunct magazines published in India
Magazines published in India
Magazines established in 1929
Malayalam-language magazines
Magazines with year of disestablishment missing